Barbate Reservoir is a reservoir in Alcalá de los Gazules, province of Cádiz, Andalusia, Spain.

See also 
 List of reservoirs and dams in Andalusia

External links 
 Agencia del agua Junta de Andalucía 
 Reservoirs status summary 
 Confederación Hidrográfica del Guadalquivir 

Reservoirs in Andalusia